Q82 may refer to:
 Q82 (New York City bus)
 Al-Infitar, a surah of the Quran